Alexander H. Curtis (1829 - July 20, 1878) was a state legislator in the Alabama House of Representatives and the Alabama Senate during the Reconstruction era.

Early life 

Curtis was born 1829, a slave, in Raleigh, North Carolina on E. Haywood's plantation, then was taken to Alabama when ten years old in 1839.
While young he worked as a servant and in a general store.

Life and non political career 
As an adult he worked as a barber and in others trades in Marion, Alabama saving for his freedom. 
By 1859 he had saved enough to be able to purchase his own freedom at the price of $2,000 after-which he left Alabama and moved to New York. 
After the Civil War he returned to Alabama and set up again as a barber head of a trade concern.  
He continued until 1875 when he was considered "out of business" even though he had been rated as "honest and reliable" by credit assessors.

In 1867 he was one of nine former slaves, known as The Marion 9, that setup the Lincoln School of Marion.

He also was one of the founders of Selma University and was described as an active member of the Second Baptist Church in Marion.

He had two sons William Curtis who became a doctor in Saint Louis and Thomas Curtis who became a dentist in Saint Louis.

Reconstruction era political career 
Curtis represented Perry County, Alabama at the 1867 Constitutional Convention.

He represented Perry County in the Alabama House of Representatives from 1870 to 1872 and then the Alabama Senate from 1872 to 1874. He and other 1872 Alabama Senators were photographed on the capitol steps. The photograph is held by the Alabama Department of Archives and History. He was the only African-American lawmaker to preside over the Alabama Senate during this era.

He was also one of the county commissioners in 1874 and was a delegate to the state constitutional convention in 1875.
He was accused along with Greene S. W. Lewis of being bigoted and attempting to rally the black majority to vote against the constitutional convention.

He was also a delegate to the 1876 Republican National Convention, and the 1878 Radical State Convention.

Death 
He died Saturday July 20, 1878  after falling from his buggy while travelling the lower Marion road with his companion Nick Stephens.
He had been aspiring to run for Congress at the time of his death.

Legacy
Two of his sons became doctors.

See also
African-American officeholders during and following the Reconstruction era

References

1829 births
1878 deaths
People from Raleigh, North Carolina
Members of the Alabama House of Representatives
Alabama state senators
African-American state legislators in Alabama
African-American politicians during the Reconstruction Era